Lorikayan is the most famous folklore of Bhojpuri. Its protagonist is Lorik. The sense in which the hero narrates the life-events of Lorik in this folklore full of heroic rasa, is delightful to see and hear. Lorik is remembered as a great ancestor of historical heroes and Ahirs. It is also called the 'Ramayana' of the Ahir caste.

This story is famous in Chhattisgarh under the name Lorik-Chanda, it is a love story of Lorik-Chanda. It is presented as a folkloric-dance-drama. The saga is based on the love affair of a married princess Chanda and married Ahir Lorik. This story is based on events that Lorik encounters, family opposition, social disdain and how he escapes them all. The song-dance continues throughout the night, in which the men perform the Chandeni Premagatha dance in special costumes. Timki and dholak instruments are used in dance.

Literature
Sufi poet Maulana Dawood chose the folklore of Lorik and Chanda to write "Chandayan", the first Hindi Sufi love poem 1389.  He believed that "Chandayan" is a divine truth and its shruti are equivalent to the verses of the Quran.

Lorik-Chanda in Chhattisgarh
Lorik-Chanda in Chhattisgarh is a famous folk dance-drama.
 It is one of Chhattisgarh's major performance arts. This folk dance in Balod district is particularly popular. Its heroine Chanda who is the daughter of King Mahar. The king has married her a person who is often ill. Lorik is a gwala from Ahir caste who grazes a cow. He is very beautiful and strong and proud of the Raut society. Princess Chanda, who is very beautiful, is fascinated by Lorik's flute playing and falls in love with her heart.

When Chanda is going to her husband's house, only a person Bathua tries to rob her respect.  At the same time Lorik reaches there and saves 'Chanda'.  Chanda is captivated by the valor of this  man.  Seeing the beauty of Chanda, Lorik also loses his mind.  Both of them meet and meet.

One day Lorik went to the city to get the goods, Princess Chanda thinks in her mind how to call Lorik to herself. Here all the girls in the market were fascinated by Lorik and surrounded him.  Chanda took the help of Malin the old lady and lured him to send Lorik to the city market.  The old lady goes to the market to call Lorik and goes there and tells Lorik that your grandfather has brought another cow and another calf.  I am very upset with this.  It will be great if you walk home and see.  She calls Lorik by telling such a lie. 

One day both decide to run away from home.  Annoyed by this decision of married lovers, Chanda's husband Veerabavan tries to kill them but is unable to kill them.  On the way, Snake bites Lorik, but he recovers by the grace of Mahadev and Parvati. Later on, Lorik wins the battle over the King of Karingha.

One day while living happily with Chanda, Lorik gets the news that his first wife Manjari is on the verge of begging and the cows have gone somewhere.  Lorik comes back to his village with Chanda to save his wife and search for cows.  Sautiya envy leads to a fight between Manjari and Chanda.  Manjari wins in this fight.  Lorik is sad to see this and then leaves everything and goes forever.

In fact, Lorik Chanda's saga is also seen as a magical link to create an analogy between inequality as the protagonist is Yaduvanshi and feeds the cow while the heroine is the king's daughter.  Famous folk admirer Ram Hriday Tiwari considers this saga to be an unmitigated desire to seek the love of two human beings.  Ramakant Srivastava, a narrator who has done a detailed study on folklore, says that the society does not look at the love affair of married woman and man with good eyes, but stereotypes appear to be broken in the saga of Lorik-Chanda.  In this we get acquainted with the mature love of married people.

References

Ahir
Indian folk songs
Indian folklore